La Habra (archaic spelling of La Abra) is a city in the northwestern corner of Orange County, California, United States. In the 2010 census, the city had a population of 60,239. A related city, La Habra Heights, is located to the north of La Habra, and is in Los Angeles County.

History

Origin of name
The name referred to the “Pass Through the Hills,” the natural pass through the hills to the north first discovered and used by Spanish explorers of the Portola expedition on July 30, 1769.

In 1839, when the area was part of Alta California, vast herds of cattle and horses grazed over the hills and valleys of Southern California.  Mariano Reyes Roldan was granted  in that year and named his land Rancho Cañada de La Habra. In the 1860s, Abel Stearns purchased Rancho La Habra.

Historical information
La Habra was founded in 1896.   The first post office in the town was established in 1898 in a corner of Coy's Store at Central (now La Habra Boulevard) and Euclid Street.

The city was incorporated under general law on January 20, 1925, with a population of 3,000. The police force was organized in 1926 and employed a chief, traffic officer and patrolman. By 1928, the city was the largest avocado center in Southern California. In 1930, the first fire department building was constructed followed by the original City Hall in 1935. By 1950, the population reached nearly 5,000. The Civic Center took shape when the existing County Library was dedicated in 1966, followed by the present administration building in 1969.

For more than 70 years, La Habra was known as the city just south of La Habra Heights, where the 'Hass' avacado, of the 'Hass' avocado mother tree, was planted by Rudolph Hass in the 1920s. The fruit from this tree has since become one of the most popular avocado cultivars worldwide. The 'Hass' mother tree succumbed to root rot in 2002.

The La Habra Stakes, run since 1973 at the Santa Anita Park Thoroughbred race track, is named for La Habra.
Although La Habra lies within Orange County, the city contracts with the Los Angeles County Fire Department for EMS and fire protection.

Law enforcement is provided by the La Habra Police Department, which in 2008 employed about 70 officers. From 2004 to 2008, they ranked third in the number of officer-involved shootings among twenty Orange County municipal police departments. One case among these, the 2007 death of Michael Cho, resulted in a wrongful death lawsuit against the city which was settled in September 2010 for $250,000.

Geography

It is bordered by La Habra Heights on the north, Brea on the east, Fullerton on the south and southeast, La Mirada on the west and southwest, East Whittier on the west, Whittier on the northwest, and a small unnamed section of unincorporated Los Angeles County on the northeast.

Climate
According to the Köppen climate classification, La Habra has a hot-summer Mediterranean climate, Csa on climate maps.

Demographics

2010
At the 2010 census, La Habra had a population of 60,239. The racial makeup of La Habra was 35,147 (58.3%) White (30.2% non-Hispanic White), 1,025 (1.7%) African American, 531 (0.9%) Native American, 5,653 (9.4%) Asian, 103 (0.2%) Pacific Islander, 15,224 (25.3%) from other races, and 2,556 (4.2%) from two or more races. Hispanics or Latinos of any race were 34,449 persons (57.2%).

The census reported that 59,899 people (99.4% of the population) lived in households, 169 (0.3%) lived in noninstitutionalized group quarters, and 171 (0.3%) were institutionalized.

Of the 18,977 households, 7,937 (41.8%) had children under 18 living in them, 10,078 (53.1%) were opposite-sex married couples living together, 2,905 (15.3%) had a female householder with no husband present, 1,327 (7.0%) had a male householder with no wife present, 1,158 (6.1%) were unmarried opposite-sex partnerships, and 119 (0.6%) were same-sex married couples or partnerships; 3,651 households (19.2%) were one person and 1,440 (7.6%) had someone living alone who was 65 or older. The average household size was 3.16.  There were 14,310 families (75.4% of households); the average family size was 3.58.

The age distribution was 16,062 people (26.7%) under 18, 6,353 people (10.5%) 18 to 24, 17,349 (28.8%) 25 to 44, 13,926 people (23.1%) 45 to 64, and 6,549 people (10.9%) who were 65 or older.  The median age was 33.6 years. For every 100 females, there were 97.0 males.  For every 100 females 18 and over, there were 94.0 males.

The 19,924 housing units had an average density of 2,701.2 per square mile, of the occupied units 10,941 (57.7%) were owner-occupied and 8,036 (42.3%) were rented. The homeowner vacancy rate was 1.5%; the rental vacancy rate was 6.2%. About 33,609 people (55.8% of the population) lived in owner-occupied housing units, and 26,290 people (43.6%) lived in rental housing units.

According to the 2010 United States Census, La Habra had a median household income of $60,954, with 14.0% of the population living below the federal poverty line.

2000
At the 2000 census, 58,974 people in 18,947 households, including 14,020 families, lived in the city. The population density averaged 8,045.8 inhabitants per square mile (3,106.4/km). The racial makeup of the city was 41.4% White, 1.4% Black or African American, 1.0% Native American, 6.0% Asian, 2.4% from other races, and 4.7% from two or more races. About 49.0% of the population were Hispanics or Latinos of any race.
Of the 19,042 households, 39.3% had children under 18 living with them, 54.5% were married couples living together, 13.5% had a female householder with no husband present, and 26.0% were not families. About 21.0% of households were one person and 8.0% were one person 65 or older. The average household size was 3.08 and the average family size was 3.56.

The age distribution was 29.1% under 18, 10.3% from 18 to 24, 31.7% from 25 to 44, 18.2% from 45 to 64, and 10.8% 65 or older. The median age was 31 years. For every 100 females, there were 97.1 males. For every 100 females 18 and over, there were 94.7 males.

The median household income was $47,652 and the median family income was $51,971. Males had a median income of $36,813 versus $30,466 for females. The per capita income for the city was $18,923. About 19.1% of families and 22.9% of the population were below the poverty line.

Economy

Top employers
According to the city's 2009 Comprehensive Annual Financial Report, the top employers in the city are:

Government
La Habra's mayor is rotated among current city council members. The mayor as of 2023 is James Gomez. Current council members include Mayor Pro-Tem Daren Nigsarian, Rose Espinoza, Steve Simonian and Jose Medrano.  Though he has previously served as mayor several times, Gomez is often mistaken as the incumbent mayor of La Habra because of his nickname "Mr. La Habra" and community fame.

Politics
According to the California secretary of state, as of October 22, 2018, La Habra has 27,439 registered voters. Of those, 10,369 (37.79%) were registered Democrats, 8,745 (31.87%) were registered Republicans, and 7,150 (26.06%) have declined to state a political party/are independents.

Education
The city of La Habra is mainly served by the La Habra City School District for elementary and middle-school students and the Fullerton Joint Union High School District for high-school students, but portions of La Habra are also redirected to other school districts closer to homes of some residents.

Public schools:
La Habra City School District
Brea Olinda Unified School District
Fullerton School District
Lowell Joint School District
Fullerton Joint Union High School District
Sonora High School
La Habra High School

Private schools:
Whittier Christian High School

Transportation
Though La Habra has no freeways and three California state highways; SR 39 (covers Whittier and Beach Boulevards), SR 90 (Imperial Highway), and SR 72 (Whittier Boulevard) serve the city. The four major thoroughfares include Whittier Boulevard, Beach Boulevard, Imperial Highway, and Harbor Boulevard. Idaho Street, Euclid Street, and Palm Street are local north–south arterials and La Habra Boulevard and Lambert Road are local west–east arterials.

Notable people

Rusty Anderson - a guitarist, singer, songwriter and music producer, was born and raised in La Habra.
Librado Andrade - a Mexican boxer in the super middleweight division and older brother of Enrique, was raised in La Habra.
Brent Boyd - a graduate of Lowell HS 1975, played football at UCLA, Minnesota Vikings 1980–86, considered the "father of concussion awareness" 
Boyd Coddington - hot rod builder
Cathy Cooper - stylist, artist, model
Jack Cooper - composer, arranger, woodwind player
Jeanette Dimech - Spanish singer
Jesse Sandoval Flores - a Major League Baseball pitcher (1942–50), played for the Chicago Cubs, Philadelphia Athletics, and Cleveland Indians.
The Funeral Pyre - Blackened death metal band
Greg Gaines- LA Rams Super Bowl LVI-winning NFL player
Natalie Golda - water polo player, Olympian
Jennifer Hanson - country music singer
Jenna Haze - adult film actress
Ronnie Hillman - NFL running back
William Hodgman - lawyer and prosecutor known for his work in the O. J. Simpson murder case
 Daniel Hoffman - musician, film producer 
Mark Kostabi - modern artist and composer
John N. Lotz - Air National Guard brigadier general
Ann Meyers - basketball player, Olympian, first player to be part of the U.S. National team while still in high school
Dave Meyers - basketball player, two-time NCAA Champion teams at UCLA, played for Milwaukee Bucks 1975-80
Margarita McCoy - urban planner
Alan Newman - Major League Baseball (MLB) player
Richard Nixon - U.S. President, opened a law office in La Habra in 1938
Enrique Ornelas - Mexican boxer in the middleweight division and younger brother of Librado; raised in La Habra.
Anne Ramsay - actress
Cruz Reynoso - first Latino Justice on California Supreme Court
Bubby Rossman - MLB pitcher for the Philadelphia Phillies
Josh Staumont - MLB pitcher for the Kansas City Royals
Nadya Suleman - mother of the longest-living octuplets, also known as the "Octomom"
Diane Wakoski - poet and essayist, winner of the William Carlos Williams award for her book Emerald Ice
Jonwayne - rapper and producer, previously signed to Stones Throw Records, more recently released music via his Authors Recording Company imprint
Zebrahead - punk rock/pop punk band
Norma Zimmer - honorary mayor of the City of La Habra in 1975 and featured singer and "Champagne Lady" of the Lawrence Welk Show

References

External links
 
Official website
La Habra Chamber of Commerce

 
La Habra
La Habra
Populated places established in 1898
1898 establishments in California